Mallory O'Brien may refer to:

 Mallory O'Brien, a fictional character in TV show The West Wing
 Mal O'Brien, CrossFit athlete